Reina Mundial del Banano 2014 is the 30th edition of the traditional contest of Reina Mundial del Banano. It will held in Machala, Ecuador on September 27, 2014. At the end of the event Manou Volkmer, Reina Mundial del Banano 2013 from Germany will crown her successor as Reina Mundial del Banano 2014. 18 contests all around the World will be compete for this title.

Results

Placements

Special awards

Contestants 
 All the 18 contestants in this competition:

Notes

Returns

Withdraws

Crossovers

Miss World
2011: : Antonella Cecilia Kruger (Top 36-Beach Beauty; Top 20-Top Model; Top 20 Beauty With A Purpose)

Miss International
2013: : Xiao-Wen Chen
's representative

Miss Intercontinental Pageant
2013: : Emine Aliu
's representative

Miss Queen Intercontinental
2014: : Hellen Morales (Winner)

Miss Latin America
2015: : Ilse Renate Klug (TBA)

Reinado Internacional del Café
2014: : Stefani Palma (Miss Congeniality)

Miss Caraïbes Hibiscus
2010: : Axel Carolina López Aldana (1st Runner-Up)

Miss Teen Universe
2012: : Sasha Nikyta Kam (Winner)

Miss Mesoamérica
2013: : Hellen Morales
2014: : Stefani Palma

Reina Internacional de los Mares y el Turismo
2012: : Antonella Cecilia Kruger (Winner)

External links
 Complete List of Contestants and mode details on Pageantopolis

2014 beauty pageants
Beauty pageants in Ecuador